is a Japanese manga series written and illustrated by Kazune Kawahara. It was serialized in Shueisha's Bessatsu Margaret magazine from January 2016 to October 2020, with its chapters collected into fourteen tankōbon volumes.

The series won the 64th Shogakukan Manga Award in the shōjo category in 2019.

Publication
Written and illustrated by Kazune Kawahara, Suteki na Kareshi began serialization in Shueisha's shōjo manga magazine Bessatsu Margaret on January 13, 2016. In July 2017, an extra chapter was published in Betsuma Spin-off, a supplementary magazine of Bessatsu Margaret. The series ended its serialization on October 13, 2020. Shueisha collected the manga's chapters into fourteen tankōbon volumes, published from May 2016 to November 2020.

Volume list

Reception
As of December 2020, Suteki na Kareshi had over three million copies in circulation.

The series ranked 17th in the 2017 edition of Takarajimasha's Kono Manga ga Sugoi! list of best manga for female readers. In 2018, it was nominated at the 42nd Kodansha Manga Award in the shōjo category. The following year, the series won the 64th Shogakukan Manga Award in the same category.

References

External links
  

Romantic comedy anime and manga
Shōjo manga
Shueisha manga
Winners of the Shogakukan Manga Award for shōjo manga